"Champagne Poetry" is a song by Canadian rapper Drake. Released on September 3, 2021, as the first track from Drake's sixth studio album Certified Lover Boy.

The songs intro was received well by critics and remixed by other artists such as Lupe Fiasco, Freddie Gibbs, IDK and others.

The phrase "I love you, I love you, I love you" is a musical and lyrical quote from the song "Michelle" by The Beatles. Respectively, Drake credits the Lennon-McCartney songwriting partnership on the track.

Charts

Weekly charts

Year-end charts

Certifications

References

2021 songs
Drake (musician) songs
Songs written by Drake (musician)